Willard Roy Riebe (August 15, 1917 – February 6, 2000) was an American professional basketball player. He played in the National Basketball League for the Cleveland Chase Brassmen / Allmen Transfers between the 1943–44 and 1945–46 seasons. Riebe averaged 3.5 points per game.

References

1917 births
2000 deaths
American men's basketball players
Basketball players from Cleveland
Cleveland Allmen Transfers players
Cleveland Chase Brassmen players
Cleveland Rosenblums players
Guards (basketball)